Play Magazine was a weekly online sports magazine, associated with The New York Times. The magazine was later published quarterly. It was first published in February 2006. Mark Bryant was the editor-in-chief of the magazine which ceased publication in Fall 2008.

References

External links
Official website

Online magazines published in the United States
Quarterly magazines published in the United States
Sports magazines published in the United States
Weekly magazines published in the United States
Defunct magazines published in the United States
Magazines established in 2006
Magazines disestablished in 2008
Magazines published in New York City
Play